The 2014–15 Meistriliiga season was the 75th season of the Meistriliiga, the top level of ice hockey in Estonia, since the league's formation in 1934. The title was won by Tartu Kalev-Välk who defeated Narva PSK in the finals.

Teams

Regular season

Despite finishing the regular season first, Tallinn HC Viking were stripped of their playoffs spot due to unpaid debts.

Playoffs

References

External links
Official site of the Meistriliiga

Estonia
2014 in Estonian sport
2015 in Estonian sport
Meistriliiga (ice hockey) seasons